was a fudai feudal domain of Edo period Japan. It was located in northern Mino Province and southern Echizen Province, in central Honshū. The domain was centered at Gujō Hachiman Castle, located in what is now the city of Gujō in Gifu Prefecture. For this reason, it was also called .

History
During the Sengoku period, the area around Gujō was controlled by the Endō clan, who pledged fealty to Oda Nobunaga, followed by Toyotomi Hideyoshi. Under Hideyoshi, they were reduced to serve under the Inaba clan; however, following the Battle of Sekigahara, the Inaba were transferred to Usuki Domain in Bungo Province, and the Endō clan was restored to their former territories, becoming daimyō of the 27,000 koku Gujō Domain from 1600 to 1693. The 3rd Endō daimyō, Endō Tsunetomo reduced the domain to 24,000 koku by giving 2,000 koku and 1,000 koku holdings to two of his younger brothers, but was successful in elevating his official status to that of a “castellan”. His successor, Endō Tsuneharu faced problems with peasant revolts, and his successor, Endō Tsunehisa was a minor, and died of poisoning soon after taking office. However, the Endō clan escaped attainder, and were transferred to the 10,000 koku Mikami Domain in Shimotsuke Province, where they resided to the Meiji restoration.

The Endō were replaced by a cadet branch of the Inoue clan from Kasama Domain in Hitachi Province from 1692 to 1697, with a kokudaka of 50,000 koku.

The Inoue were transferred to Kameyama Domain in Tanba Province in 1697 and were replaced by the Kanemori clan from Kamiyama Domain in Mutsu Province from 1697 to 1758 with a kokudaka set at 38,000 koku. The Kanemori faced a 4-year peasant revolt from 1754 which they were unable to suppress, and they were removed from office by the Tokugawa shogunate.

In 1758, the shogunate entrusted Gujō to the Aoyama clan, formerly of Miyazu Domain in Tango Province, with a kokudaka of 48,000 koku. The Aoyama ruled until the Meiji restoration. During the Boshin War, the domain contributed its military forces to the Satchō Alliance, although many of its samurai defected to the Tokugawa side.

In 1871, with the abolition of the han system, the domain became part of Gifu Prefecture.

Bakumatsu period holdings
As with most domains in the han system, Gujō Domain consisted of a discontinuous territories calculated to provide the assigned kokudaka, based on periodic cadastral surveys and projected agricultural yields.

Mino Province
125 villages in Gujō District
Echizen Province
5 villages in Nanjō District
13 villages in Nyū District
69 villages in Ōno District

List of daimyō

References
The content of this article was largely derived from that of the corresponding article on Japanese Wikipedia.

External links
http://www.asahi-net.or.jp/~me4k-skri/han/toukai/takatomi.html Takatomi on "Edo 300 HTML”] 

Domains of Japan
1600 establishments in Japan
History of Gifu Prefecture
Mino Province